There are four geographic features called Seaview in New Zealand:

Seaview, Hokitika, a suburb of Hokitika
Seaview, Timaru, a suburb of Timaru
Seaview, Lower Hutt, a suburb of Lower Hutt
Seaview (hill), a hill in Masterton District